Pereks is a rural locality (a village) in Slobodskoye Rural Settlement, Kharovsky District, Vologda Oblast, Russia. The population was 17 as of 2010.

Geography 
Pereks is located 46 km northeast of Kharovsk (the district's administrative centre) by road. Makarovskaya is the nearest rural locality.

References 

Rural localities in Kharovsky District